Sokołów Małopolski  is a town in Rzeszów County, Subcarpathian Voivodeship, Poland, with a population of 3,962 (2 June 2009).

Geography
Sokolow Malopolski lies in Sandomierz Basin, 24 kilometers north of Rzeszow, and 11 kilometers from Rzeszów–Jasionka Airport.

History
The history of Sokołów Małopolski starts with a forest settlement, located in once extensive Sandomierz Forest, which the sources describe as far as the 14th century. In 1569, Sokolow received a town charter, with a Renaissance street plan and a market square in the centre. In 1608, the town was looted by Stanislaw Stadnicki, a well-known troublemaker and the so-called “Devil of Łańcut”, but after this incident, Sokolow continued to prosper. In 1657, during the Swedish invasion of Poland, Sokolow was destroyed by Transilvanian army of George II Rakoczi.

Following the first partition of Poland, Sokolow was in 1772 annexed by the Habsburg Empire, and remained in Austrian Galicia until late 1918. The town burned in fires in 1863 and 1904, and did not prosper. In the Second Polish Republic, Sokolow belonged to Lwow Voivodeship, and even though it was located in the Central Industrial Region, no plant was opened here, and the promised rail line was not built.

In the 17th century, the town was protected by fortifications with five gates and moat. Sokolow has a 17th-century Jewish cemetery, and a parish church (1908–1916). Today, due to numerous wars and fires, there are only buildings from the 19th and 20th centuries.  In 2010, local villagers helped to clean up the Jewish cemetery, though without the cooperation of local officials who reportedly said they didn't want to cooperate with Jews.

At the time of the German invasion in September, 1939, Sokolow Malopolski's Jewish population was about 1600. The Germans immediately requisitioned Jews for forced labor.  In April 1942, the Jewish population, then numbering 3000 because of refugees and others resettled by the Germans in Sokolow Malopolski, was forced into a ghetto. In July, German police shot 30 residents of the ghetto, resettled 200 in a labor camp in Glogow, and moved others to the Rzeszow ghetto where they were sent to the Belzec killing camp in July.  Several dozens of Jews who hid from the deportations were murdered later in the year and in the summer of 1943, three Jews and the four Poles hiding them were shot and buried on the grounds of Sokolow Malapolski's elementary school. The number of the few Jewish survivors is unknown.

References

External links 
Official town webpage
Old Sokolow Malopolski photographs; taken about 24 years ago.

Cities and towns in Podkarpackie Voivodeship
Rzeszów County
Lwów Voivodeship